Criss is a given name and surname. Notable people with the name include:

Given name
Criss Angel (born 1967), American magician
Criss Oliva (1963–1993), American musician

Surname

Anthony Criss (born 1970), American rapper and actor
Charlie Criss (born 1948), American basketball player
Clair Carlton Criss (1879–1952), American businessman who developed what became Mutual of Omaha
Crissy Criss (born 1987), British radio presenter
Darren Criss (born 1987), American actor and singer
Dode Criss (1885–1955), American baseball player
Fannie Criss (1866–1942), African-American fashion designer
Francis Criss (1901–1973), American painter
Nancy Criss (born 1960), American actress and film producer
Peter Criss (born 1945), American musician
Sonny Criss (1927–1977), American jazz musician

See also
Criss-cross (disambiguation)
Romani CRISS

Given names